Banawa Selatan (South Banawa) is a district of Donggala Regency, Central Sulawesi, Indonesia. The district capital is Watatu.

References 
 

Districts of Central Sulawesi